Eulima lactea is a species of sea snail, a marine gastropod mollusk in the family Eulimidae. The species is one of a number within the genus Eulima. It is found in the Red Sea.

References

External links
 To World Register of Marine Species

lactea
Gastropods described in 1854
Fauna of the Red Sea